Bear Swamp Creek is a tributary of Tunkhannock Creek in Susquehanna County, Pennsylvania, in the United States. The creek has no named tributaries, and is not designated as an impaired waterbody. It does pass through a wetland known as Bear Swamp. The drainage basin of the creek is designated as a Coldwater Fishery and a Migratory Fishery.

Course
Bear Swamp Creek begins on the western side of East Mountain in Gibson Township. It flows west-southwest into a valley for several tenths of a mile before turning southwest. After several tenths of a mile, the creek reaches the bottom of the mountain, passes through an unnamed lake and turns south-southwest, receiving an unnamed tributary from the left. After a few miles, the creek enters a wetland known as Bear Swamp and passes into Clifford Township. Here, it turns west and then north, flowing alongside Carey Hill and reentering Gibson Township after a few tenths of a mile. The creek then turns north-northwest for several tenths of a mile before turning north. A few tenths of a mile further downstream, it reaches its confluence with Tunkhannock Creek.

Hydrology, geography and geology

The surficial geology near the mouth of Bear Swamp Creek mainly consists of a till known as Wisconsinan Till, plus some patches of alluvium. However, the nearby Carey Hill has surficial geology consisting almost entirely of bedrock consisting of sandstone and shale. There are some patches of peat bogs, wetlands, and lakes near the creek, but the surficial geology in the upper reaches mostly consists of alluvium and Wisconsinan Till, with some bedrock further away.

Bear Swamp is not designated as an impaired waterbody.

Watershed and biology
The mouth of the creek is in the United States Geological Survey of Lenoxville. Its source is in the quadrangle of Clifford. The creek's mouth is located within  of South Gibson.

A swamp known as Bear Swamp is located in the vicinity of Bear Swamp Creek.

The drainage basin of Bear Swamp Creek is designated as a Coldwater Fishery and a Migratory Fishery. The designated use of the creek is aquatic life.

History
Bear Swamp Creek was entered into the Geographic Names Information System on August 2, 1979. Its identifier in the Geographic Names Information System is 1168952.

Bear Swamp, which is located near Bear Swamp Creek, received its name after John Collar, one of the earliest settlers on Tunkhannock Creek in Gibson Township, trapped nine bears there in one season. An unsuccessful oil well was once sunk at Bear Swamp.

See also
Bell Creek (Tunkhannock Creek), next tributary of Tunkhannock Creek going downstream
Rock Creek (Tunkhannock Creek), next tributary of Tunkhannock Creek going upstream
List of rivers of Pennsylvania

References

Rivers of Susquehanna County, Pennsylvania
Tributaries of Tunkhannock Creek
Rivers of Pennsylvania